Lois Lilley Howe (September 25, 1864 – September 13, 1964) was an American architect and founder of the first all female architecture firm in Boston, Massachusetts.

Biography
Howe was born in Cambridge, Massachusetts. Howe studied at the Museum of Fine Arts School from 1882-1886. She later studied architecture at the Massachusetts Institute of Technology, which, by virtue of its land grant status, was one of only six American schools of architecture that admitted women before 1910. Howe graduated in 1890. In a class of only 66 students, she was the only woman.

After graduation she worked in the offices of Allen and Kenway (later renamed Allen & Collens). She placed second, after Sophia Hayden, in a competition to design the Women's Building at the Chicago World's Fair. Howe opened her own architecture office in 1894. At first, her projects consisted of new or remodeled houses for friends and acquaintances, but her efforts soon began to pay off in more commissions. By 1900, she had enough work to set up an office in downtown Boston. In 1907, she advocated for an innovative use of plaster, authoring articles in Architectural Review and Architectural Record. She had a passion for history and architecture details, which emerged not only in her work, but also in a book she published in 1913 with Constance Fuller, another MIT graduate, entitled Details of Old New England Houses. In 1913, she partnered with Eleanor Manning and in 1926 Mary Almy joined the firm which then became Howe, Manning & Almy, Inc. Architect Eliza Newkirk Rogers worked for Howe before starting her own practice in 1913. For a short time around 1920, the landscape architect Elizabeth Greenleaf Pattee worked for Howe.

During her career, Howe was president of the Business Women's Club of Boston and president of the MIT Women's Association. She served on the Boston Society of Architect's Small House Bureau, the AIA Committee on Small Houses, and was appointed to the Board of Directors of the Housing Association of Metropolitan Boston. Howe was 73 when she retired in 1937; Howe, Manning & Almy, Inc. dissolved and her partners launched independent practices. Long after she finished practicing architecture, she continued to practice history, giving talks at the Cambridge Historical Society, trying to recall for younger members Cambridge as it was in her girlhood. Howe died in 1964, just short of her one-hundredth birthday.

Awards and recognition
She received her first acclaim in 1893 where she was a second place winning in the national competition for the Woman's Building at the World's Columbian Exhibition in Chicago.

In 1901, Howe became the second woman member of the American Institute of Architecture (AIA). In 1931, she was elected the first female Fellow of the AIA.

Many of their designs were featured in articles and books of House Beautiful and Architecture, extolling the best small houses.

Work 
The firm of Howe, Manning & Almy completed over 426 commissions, 500 projects (most of which are still in existence) over 43 years of practice. Lasting designs, careful craftsmanship, first-rate materials, and desirable locations have made their houses some of the most comfortable and attractive dwellings, as well as some of the most exceptional investments, in these geographic areas today.

Legacy
Lois Lilley Howe's papers reside in the collection for Howe, Manning, and Almy at MIT. The Lois Lilley Howe photographic collection is housed at the Cambridge Historical Society.

References

Further reading 
Pioneering Women of American Architecture, Lois Lilley Howe
 
 Lois Lilley Howe History Hub - History Cambridge

1864 births
1964 deaths
American women architects
Architects from Cambridge, Massachusetts
Architects from Boston
20th-century American architects
20th-century American women